The Star Awards for Best Actor is an award presented annually at the Star Awards, a ceremony that was established in 1994.

The category was introduced in 1995, at the 2nd Star Awards ceremony; Li Nanxing received the award for his role in Wounded Tracks and it is given in honour of a Mediacorp actor who has delivered an outstanding performance in a leading role. The nominees are determined by a team of judges employed by Mediacorp; winners are selected by a majority vote from the entire judging panel.

Since its inception, the award has been given to 11 actors. Chen Hanwei is the most recent winner in this category for his role in Recipe of Life. Since the ceremony held in 2022, Chen remains as the only actor to win in this category seven times, surpassing Xie Shaoguang who has five wins. Chen and Christopher Lee have been nominated on 14 occasions, more than any other actor. Tay Ping Hui holds the record for the most nominations without a win, with eight (he eventually won his first award in 2012). Terence Cao is currently the actor who has the most nominations without a win, with six.

Recipients

Nominees distribution chart

Award records

Multiple awards and nominations

The following individuals received two or more Best Actor awards:

The following individuals received two or more Best Actor nominations:

References

External links 

Star Awards